Aliti Toribau (born 19 March 2001) is a Fijian netball player who plays in the positions of center, wing attack or wing defense. 

She was included in the Fijian squad for the 2019 Netball World Cup, which was also her maiden appearance at a Netball World Cup.

References 

2001 births
Living people
Fijian netball players
2019 Netball World Cup players